"Cannonball" is the opening track from Supertramp's 1985 album Brother Where You Bound.

Overview
"Cannonball" was written and sung by keyboardist Rick Davies entirely in the chord of G minor. Davies stated in an interview "I did it simply to see if it could be done".

The lyrics to the song may have been seen as a veiled message to former member Roger Hodgson but Davies revealed in a French radio interview that they were inspired by a less than perfect concert promoter whom he refused to name.

The track became Supertramp's last US Top 40 single to date, peaking at number 28 on the Billboard singles charts in July 1985. It also crossed over to the dance charts, peaking at number nine.

On the flip side of the 12-inch release is a 10-minute instrumental version of the song.
Near the LP version's fade-out, the brass play a citation of the Jazz tune Topsy.

The promo video was directed by Steve Barron and depicted a caveman who goes after his wayward cavewoman, who left his home to travel to modern day Grand Junction, CO to see the band rehearsing the song on stage. When he sees her, he bellows...and wakes up to see the cavewoman there in the cave, realizing he had dreamed it all.

Personnel
 Rick Davies: piano, synthesizer, vocals
 John Helliwell: saxophones
 Bob Siebenberg: drums
 Dougie Thomson: bass
 Marty Walsh: guitar
 Doug Wintz: trombone

Chart performance

References

Supertramp songs
1985 singles
Songs written by Rick Davies
1985 songs
A&M Records singles